The Ghana Society for Medical Physics is Ghana's representative body for all medical physicists in the country. The organization's purpose is to unite and support its members in Ghana.  It was set up in January 2011 to advance the use of principles of physics in medicine. The Society is the governing body for all medical physicists in Ghana, and contributes to their training.

The Society operates under a constitution,  code of ethics, and Practice Standards. All its operations are subject to the Ghana Health Professions Regulatory Bodies Act 857 of 2013. The organization carries out research in the areas of radiation therapy, medical imaging and nuclear medicine, and collaborates with other organizations to host seminars and training courses. The Ghana Society for Medical Physics  is Ghana's national representative to the Federation of African Medical Physics Organizations (FAMPO), and represents the International Organization for Medical Physics (IOMP) in Ghana.

The Society's headquarters is in Accra, at the Medical Physics Department of the School of Nuclear and Allied Sciences of the University of Ghana.

Affiliations 

 International Organization for Medical Physics (IOMP) 
 Federation of African Medical Physics Organizations (FAMPO)
 International Atomic Energy Agency (IAEA)
 Allied Health Professional Council of Ghana (AHPC)

Past presidents of GSMP 
 Professor John Humphery Amuasi (2011 - 2017)

References

External links 
 Official website

Medical physics organizations
Professional associations based in Ghana
2011 establishments in Ghana
Organizations established in 2011